Phew is the debut album by Japanese singer Phew, released in June 1981 by Japanese label Pass Records run by Yoshitaka Goto and recorded at Conny Plank studio in Cologne, with Holger Czukay & Jaki Liebezeit in January and February 1981.

Track listing

References

External links 
 

1981 debut albums